The Caledonian Railway 72 Class was a class of 4-4-0 steam locomotives introduced by William Pickersgill for the Caledonian Railway (CR) in 1920.  Thirty-two locomotives were built and all survived to be taken over by the London, Midland and Scottish Railway (LMS) in 1923 and by British Railways (BR) in 1948.  The earlier 113 Class (introduced in 1916), of which 16 were produced, were similar but slightly smaller. These were the Caledonian's last express passenger locomotives, and technically, the last of the Dunalastair series, and were unofficially dubbed, Dunalastair V.

Numbering

The two classes together totalled 48 locomotives. No. 54481 was scrapped after an accident at Gollafield Junction in 1953, the remainder were withdrawn between 1959 and 1962.

Dimensions
Figures given in this section are from BR Database. Figures given by Rail UK are slightly different.

72 Class
See box, top right.

113 Class
See table below.

 Introduced: 1916 
 Total produced: 16
 Locomotive weight: 
 Boiler pressure: 
 Superheater: Yes
 Cylinders: 
 Driving wheel diameter: 
 Valve gear: Stephenson
 LMS/BR Power classification: 3P
 Tractive effort:

Preservation
Although no members of the class have been preserved, there are plans to construct a replica.

See also
 Locomotives of the Caledonian Railway
 Locomotives of the London, Midland and Scottish Railway

References

072
4-4-0 locomotives
Armstrong Whitworth locomotives
NBL locomotives
Railway locomotives introduced in 1920
Scrapped locomotives
Standard gauge steam locomotives of Great Britain